The Rjurik Highlands is an accessory for the 2nd edition of the Advanced Dungeons & Dragons fantasy role-playing game, published in 1996.

Contents
The Rjurik Highlands describes the land of the Rjurik people, an untamed north-western frontier of Cerilia. The Rjurik exhibit the berserk rage of the Vos and are led by the teachings of druids, and are renowned throughout Cerilia for their martial prowess and the high quality of their weapons and armor. Expanded character generation within the sourcebook presents player with unique abilities for the Rjurik, including modified bard and druid careers to double-edged, inherent Rjurik curses. The book depicts the various Rjurik tribes, their cultures and societies, the tension between the original nomadic tribes and the urban settlers, and comprehensive information on the geography of the highland areas. The land offers many possible domains for a potential emperor, including the wild land of Taelshore, the bitterly cold tundra and untouched woods of the northlands, and the desolate realms of the Wildlands. Each domain is presented in a double-page layout detailing the law, guilds and temples of the nations, along with what magical sources are present and those who have taken possession of them, and important NPCs, allies and enemies, the trade situation and the armed forces available to the players. Each region is under intense political and social tension, and they must contend with powerful anwnshegh such as the White Witch surrounding them, humanoid alliances intent on conquest, and power-hungry rivals kept in check only by the struggle for survival. Six cardsheets are included which detail major settlements, powerful NPCs, adventure tips, and a layout of Rjurik domains for players to plan and track their ambitions for territory.

The Rjurik Highlands describes the wilds of northwestern Cerilia, where dwell the fearsome but honorable warriors, the Rjurik, and their unique druidic priests. This package is designed to give a complete picture of the lands and peoples it addresses and to lay out the realm for use by DMs and players who wish to rule its varied kingdoms.  The inspiration for the region comes from the cultures of the Celts and Viking (Nordic countries: Scandinavia).

Publication history
The Rjurik Highlands was published by TSR, Inc. in 1996.

Reception
David Comford reviewed The Rjurik Highlands for Arcane magazine, rating it a 9 out of 10 overall. He describes the culture of the Rjurik as "seemingly born from a blend of North American Indian traditions and beliefs, and barbarian/Viking brute strength". Comford declares that The Rjurik Highlands has to be an essential addition to any Birthright referee's collection. The sourcebook is well planned and presented." He states: "Not only does The Rjurik Highlands expansion provide excellent material for adventuring, but the new warcards for the famed warriors are a must for any armed force - whether allied or opposed to the PCs. The brute strength of the north races shines through additional bonuses and the amount of hits that each unit can take before it is destroyed." Comford concludes his review by saying, "With first-class artwork to complement the text, it's hard to find fault here. The warcards are a little tame for the legendary fighters, and the sourcebook is repetitious - but this by no means detracts from the book's excellent content."

Reviews
Dragon #233

References

Birthright (campaign setting) supplements
Role-playing game supplements introduced in 1996